is a Japanese manga artist known for several works, including The Momotaroh, Bomber Girl and Jinnairyū Jyūjyutsu Butouden Majimakun Suttobasu!!. Niwano has also written a manga adaptation of Deltora Quest which was adapted into an anime series, and was a mentor to Takeshi Obata of Hikaru no Go and Death Note fame.

Works
The Momotaroh (1987-1989)
The Momotaroh Part. 2 (2004)
Chō Kidō Bōhatsu Soccer Yarō Libero no Takeda (1991-1992)
Bomber Girl (1993)
Bomber Girl Crush! (2001)
Bomber Girl XXX (2004)
Jinnairyū Jyūjyutsu Butouden Majimakun Suttobasu!! (1995-1998)
Jinnairyū Jyūjyutsu Rurouden Majima, Hazeru!! (2009)
Tōshin Susanoo (1998)
Base Boys (1999)
Sexual Package (2001)
Turkey Junkie (2001)
Prosecutor Ai (2003) (illustrator)
Deltora Quest (2005-2008)
Momotaroh vs Rei Majima (2007)
AD Boy (2009)

References

Living people
Manga artists from Kagoshima Prefecture
1964 births